Live at the Palais is a live album by American singer-songwriter Michael Nesmith, originally released in 1978. It was recorded in 1977 at the Palais Theatre in Melbourne.

Most of the songs on the album were derived from the half-dozen albums Nesmith recorded for RCA Records in the early 1970s. The album reunited Nesmith with drummer John Ware, whom he had worked with on his first three  albums Magnetic South, Loose Salute, and Nevada Fighter, and also marked one of his first collaborations with guitarist John Jorgenson and keyboardist John Hobbs; both would play in the group the Hellecasters with help from Nesmith.

The album did not sell very well. Nesmith lampoons the album on his Grammy Award winning 1981 music/comedy video, Elephant Parts.

CD release
In the 1990s, when his Pacific Arts back catalog was being reissued on CD, Nesmith withheld Live at the Palais from re-release citing dissatisfaction with his performance. However, due to demand from his fans worldwide, Nesmith reissued the album in 2001 and included nearly a half-hour of bonus material drawn from other live performances.

Track listing
All songs by Michael Nesmith unless otherwise noted.
 "Grand Ennui" – 7:24
 "Calico Girlfriend" – 4:59
 "Propinquity" – 6:12
 "Joanne" – 7:09
 "Roll With the Flow" – 6:18
 "Some of Shelly's Blues" – 5:40
 "Silver Moon" – 8:14
 "Nadine (Is It You?)" (Chuck Berry) – 6:43
2004 reissue bonus tracks:
 "Grand Ennui" – 5:02
 "Capsule" – 6:46
 "Crippled Lion" – 4:16
 "Listen to the Band" – 4:41

Personnel
Michael Nesmith – vocals, guitar
Al Perkins – lead, slide and pedal steel guitars
John Ware – drums
Joe Chemay – bass
John Davis – bass
Steve Duncan – drums
John Hobbs – keyboards
John Jorgenson – guitar
Paul Leim – drums
David MacKay – bass
Jerry Swallow – guitar
James Trumbo – keyboards
Billy Joe Walker, Jr. – guitar

Michael Nesmith albums
1978 live albums